This island is part of the Thousand Islands located near Jakarta, Indonesia (Bahasa Indonesia: Pulau ini merupakan bagian dari Kepulauan Seribu yang terletak di dekat Jakarta, Indonesia)

The island gained international attention on January 9, 2021 when Sriwijaya Air Flight 182 crashed into the Java Sea near the island. The island is located north of Jakarta, Indonesia being part of the Thousand Islands.

References

External links 
 Thousand Islands official website

Coordinates on Wikidata
Thousand Islands Regency
Islands of the Java Sea